The Forcipulatida are an order of sea stars, containing three families and 49 genera.

Description
Forcipulatids share with the brisingid sea stars distinctive pedicellariae, consisting of a short stalk with three skeletal ossicles. Unlike that group, however, the forcipulatids tend to have more robust bodies. The order includes some well-known species, such as the common starfish, Asterias rubens. This order can be commonly found from North Carolina in the United States all the way to Santos in Brazil.

Phylogeny
The order is divided into three families:

 Family Asteriidae — 39 genera
 Family Heliasteridae — two genera 
 Family Zoroasteridae — eight genera

World Register of Marine Species gives another taxonomy, with 7 families and 64 genera: 
 Family Asteriidae Gray, 1840
 Family Heliasteridae Viguier, 1878
 Family Pedicellasteridae Perrier, 1884
 Family Pycnopodiidae Fisher, 1928
 Family Stichasteridae
 Family Zoroasteridae Sladen, 1889

A 2020 study involving phylogenetic analysis and scanning electron microscopy of the skeleton and ossicles of taxa from the superorder Forcipulatacea recovered Asteriidae, Stichasteridae, Zoroasteridae, and Brisingida as monophyletic.

See also
Paulasterias mcclaini
Paulasterias tyleri

References

Further reading
 Mah, C. & D. Foltz. (2011). Molecular Phylogeny of the Forcipulatacea (Asteroidea: Echinodermata): systematics and biogeography. Zoological Journal of the Linnean Society 162(3): 646-660
 Sladen, W.P. (1889). Report on the Asteroidea. Report on the Scientific Results of the Voyage of H.M.S. Challenger during the years 1873-1876, Zoology 30(51): xlii + 893 pages 118 plates.